Clubul Sportiv Gloria 2018 Bistrița-Năsăud, commonly known as Gloria Bistrița, or simply as Gloria is a Romanian football club based in Bistrița, Bistrița-Năsăud County, currently playing in the Liga III.

Founded on 31 May 2018 under the name of 1. FC Gloria, the team is considered as the unofficial successor of ACF Gloria Bistrița, both by supporters, the media, but also the club itself assuming this status. The team has a similar name, same colors (white and blue), is playing on the same stadium, also having former directors, managers and players of the old club involved in the destiny of the new entity.

History

CS Gloria Bistrița-Năsăud was founded on 31 May 2018 and was enrolled directly in the Liga III, on the place of newly promoted ACS Dumitra, club that gave its place and right to play in the third tier, as well as all the players, entire administrative and technical staff to the newly formed club, simultaneously enrolling in the fourth tier and becoming an official partner for 1. FC Gloria, as the second team. The club is considered the unofficial successor of ACF Gloria Bistrița, both by supporters, the media, but also the club itself assuming this status. The team has a similar name, same colors (white and blue), is playing on the same stadium, also having former directors, managers and players of the old club involved in the destiny of the new entity.

In the summer of 2021, 1. FC Gloria was taken over by Bistrița-Năsăud County Council and changed its name to CS Gloria Bistrița-Năsăud.

Grounds

1. FC Gloria, like its predecessor, ACF Gloria Bistrița, plays its home matches on Jean Pădureanu Stadium in Bistrița, with a capacity of 7,800 seats. The stadium is named in honor of the longest-running president of a football club in Romania, Jean Pădureanu, the man who led the old Gloria for 47 years (1966–2013). A respected, but also a controversial character, the Lord, as he was called, managed to maintain the club in the Liga I for 22 consecutive years.

Players

First-team squad

Out on loan

Club Officials

Board of directors

Current technical staff

League history

References

External links
 
 

Football clubs in Bistrița-Năsăud County
Association football clubs established in 2018
Liga III clubs
2018 establishments in Romania